Vladimír Slanina (born 4 April 1994) is a Czech male canoeist who won 12 medals at senior level at the Wildwater Canoeing World Championships.

He is the son of Vladimír Slanina, canoeist too.

Medals at the World Championships
Senior

References

External links
 

1994 births
Living people
Czech male canoeists
Place of birth missing (living people)